The 1978–79 Philadelphia Flyers season was the Philadelphia Flyers' 12th season in the National Hockey League (NHL).

Off-season
Head coach Fred Shero, who had one more year left on his contract, submitted a letter of resignation on May 22, 1978, stating that the Flyers needed a change whether they realized it or not. Flyers management had previously heard rumors about Shero wanting to leave Philadelphia and re-join the New York Rangers organization, and refused to accept his letter of resignation. Shero then signed a $250,000, five-year contract with the Rangers to be their new head coach and general manager, believing he no longer had a contractual agreement to the Flyers. A few weeks after signing Shero, the Rangers gave the Flyers their first-round pick (7th overall) in the 1978 draft and cash as compensation, allowing the Rangers to avoid tampering charges. Bob McCammon, who had just coached the Flyers' first year American Hockey League Maine Mariners farm club to a Calder Cup title, was named Shero's replacement on July 6.

The Flyers acquired the 6th overall pick from the Pittsburgh Penguins for three veterans from their Stanley Cup championship teams – Tom Bladon, Orest Kindrachuk and Ross Lonsberry – on the eve of the draft. The trade gave the Flyers three first-round picks and they selected defenseman Behn Wilson and forwards Ken Linseman and Dan Lucas.

Two other longtime Flyers also left the team during the off-season. Gary Dornhoefer retired and Joe Watson was traded to the Colorado Rockies.

Regular season
After an eight-game winless streak in January that saw the team drop to last place in the division, McCammon and assistant coach Terry Crisp were fired. Replacing him was Shero's previous assistant coach Pat Quinn, who had replaced McCammon as head coach in Maine. While McCammon returned to Maine and coached the Mariners to a second consecutive Calder Cup title, the Flyers rallied under Quinn and finished in 2nd place.

On February 17, 1979, Bernie Parent suffered a career-ending eye injury in a game against the New York Rangers. An errant stick entered the right eye hole of his mask, causing permanent damage to his vision. After hospitalization, including the complete loss of sight for two weeks, Parent recovered and eventually regained sight, although not at the level required to resume his playing career.

Season standings

Playoffs
Matched-up against the Vancouver Canucks in the preliminary round, the Flyers won the series in three games. The Flyers' season came to an end against Shero's Rangers in a five-game quarterfinal loss.

Schedule and results

Regular season

|- style="background:#ffc;"
| 1 || October 12 || @ New York Rangers || 3–3 || 0–0–1 || 1 || 
|- style="background:#cfc;"
| 2 || October 14 || @ Detroit Red Wings || 3–1 || 1–0–1 || 3 || 
|- style="background:#fcf;"
| 3 || October 15 || Montreal Canadiens || 2–3 || 1–1–1 || 3 || 
|- style="background:#cfc;"
| 4 || October 19 || Pittsburgh Penguins || 3–1 || 2–1–1 || 5 || 
|- style="background:#fcf;"
| 5 || October 21 || @ Toronto Maple Leafs || 0–2 || 2–2–1 || 5 || 
|- style="background:#fcf;"
| 6 || October 22 || Atlanta Flames || 2–5 || 2–3–1 || 5 || 
|- style="background:#ffc;"
| 7 || October 24 || @ New York Islanders || 4–4 || 2–3–2 || 6 || 
|- style="background:#cfc;"
| 8 || October 26 || Toronto Maple Leafs || 5–0 || 3–3–2 || 8 || 
|- style="background:#fcf;"
| 9 || October 29 || Vancouver Canucks || 2–5 || 3–4–2 || 8 || 
|-

|- style="background:#fcf;"
| 10 || November 1 || @ Atlanta Flames || 0–3 || 3–5–2 || 8 || 
|- style="background:#ffc;"
| 11 || November 2 || Buffalo Sabres || 3–3 || 3–5–3 || 9 || 
|- style="background:#cfc;"
| 12 || November 4 || @ Boston Bruins || 7–3 || 4–5–3 || 11 || 
|- style="background:#cfc;"
| 13 || November 5 || Colorado Rockies || 6–4 || 5–5–3 || 13 || 
|- style="background:#cfc;"
| 14 || November 8 || @ Los Angeles Kings || 5–3 || 6–5–3 || 15 || 
|- style="background:#ffc;"
| 15 || November 10 || @ Colorado Rockies || 2–2 || 6–5–4 || 16 || 
|- style="background:#cfc;"
| 16 || November 12 || @ Vancouver Canucks || 4–0 || 7–5–4 || 18 || 
|- style="background:#fcf;"
| 17 || November 16 || Chicago Black Hawks || 3–4 || 7–6–4 || 18 || 
|- style="background:#fcf;"
| 18 || November 18 || @ New York Islanders || 2–8 || 7–7–4 || 18 || 
|- style="background:#cfc;"
| 19 || November 19 || Detroit Red Wings || 4–3 || 8–7–4 || 20 || 
|- style="background:#cfc;"
| 20 || November 22 || @ Buffalo Sabres || 3–2 || 9–7–4 || 22 || 
|- style="background:#cfc;"
| 21 || November 24 || Minnesota North Stars || 4–3 || 10–7–4 || 24 || 
|- style="background:#cfc;"
| 22 || November 25 || @ Pittsburgh Penguins || 3–1 || 11–7–4 || 26 || 
|- style="background:#fcf;"
| 23 || November 28 || @ Montreal Canadiens || 0–3 || 11–8–4 || 26 || 
|- style="background:#cfc;"
| 24 || November 30 || St. Louis Blues || 3–0 || 12–8–4 || 28 || 
|-

|- style="background:#fcf;"
| 25 || December 2 || @ Boston Bruins || 3–5 || 12–9–4 || 28 || 
|- style="background:#cfc;"
| 26 || December 3 || Toronto Maple Leafs || 7–2 || 13–9–4 || 30 || 
|- style="background:#fcf;"
| 27 || December 7 || New York Rangers || 2–5 || 13–10–4 || 30 || 
|- style="background:#cfc;"
| 28 || December 9 || Boston Bruins || 9–2 || 14–10–4 || 32 || 
|- style="background:#cfc;"
| 29 || December 10 || @ New York Rangers || 4–0 || 15–10–4 || 34 || 
|- style="background:#cfc;"
| 30 || December 14 || Pittsburgh Penguins || 2–1 || 16–10–4 || 36 || 
|- style="background:#fcf;"
| 31 || December 16 || @ Atlanta Flames || 2–7 || 16–11–4 || 36 || 
|- style="background:#cfc;"
| 32 || December 17 || St. Louis Blues || 4–1 || 17–11–4 || 38 || 
|- style="background:#ffc;"
| 33 || December 19 || @ Washington Capitals || 4–4 || 17–11–5 || 39 || 
|- style="background:#cfc;"
| 34 || December 21 || Washington Capitals || 5–2 || 18–11–5 || 41 || 
|- style="background:#fcf;"
| 35 || December 23 || @ Chicago Black Hawks || 2–5 || 18–12–5 || 41 || 
|- style="background:#ffc;"
| 36 || December 26 || @ Detroit Red Wings || 2–2 || 18–12–6 || 42 || 
|- style="background:#cfc;"
| 37 || December 28 || New York Rangers || 6–5 || 19–12–6 || 44 || 
|- style="background:#fcf;"
| 38 || December 30 || @ St. Louis Blues || 3–6 || 19–13–6 || 44 || 
|-

|- style="background:#cfc;"
| 39 || January 4 || New York Islanders || 3–2 || 20–13–6 || 46 || 
|- style="background:#fcf;"
| 40 || January 6 || @ New York Islanders || 1–5 || 20–14–6 || 46 || 
|- style="background:#cfc;"
| 41 || January 7 || Los Angeles Kings || 3–0 || 21–14–6 || 48 || 
|- style="background:#cfc;"
| 42 || January 9 || @ Washington Capitals || 5–2 || 22–14–6 || 50 || 
|- style="background:#ffc;"
| 43 || January 11 || Detroit Red Wings || 3–3 || 22–14–7 || 51 || 
|- style="background:#ffc;"
| 44 || January 14 || New York Islanders || 1–1 || 22–14–8 || 52 || 
|- style="background:#fcf;"
| 45 || January 16 || @ Atlanta Flames || 0–5 || 22–15–8 || 52 || 
|- style="background:#ffc;"
| 46 || January 18 || Buffalo Sabres || 4–4 || 22–15–9 || 53 || 
|- style="background:#ffc;"
| 47 || January 20 || @ Montreal Canadiens || 5–5 || 22–15–10 || 54 || 
|- style="background:#ffc;"
| 48 || January 21 || @ New York Rangers || 5–5 || 22–15–11 || 55 || 
|- style="background:#fcf;"
| 49 || January 27 || @ Minnesota North Stars || 1–3 || 22–16–11 || 55 || 
|- style="background:#fcf;"
| 50 || January 29 || Montreal Canadiens || 3–7 || 22–17–11 || 55 || 
|-

|- style="background:#fcf;"
| 51 || February 1 || New York Islanders || 1–4 || 22–18–11 || 55 || 
|- style="background:#cfc;"
| 52 || February 4 || Atlanta Flames || 7–4 || 23–18–11 || 57 || 
|- style="background:#ffc;"
| 53 || February 14 || @ Toronto Maple Leafs || 2–2 || 23–18–12 || 58 || 
|- style="background:#cfc;"
| 54 || February 15 || Boston Bruins || 5–3 || 24–18–12 || 60 || 
|- style="background:#fcf;"
| 55 || February 17 || New York Rangers || 2–4 || 24–19–12 || 60 || 
|- style="background:#cfc;"
| 56 || February 18 || Minnesota North Stars || 3–2 || 25–19–12 || 62 || 
|- style="background:#ffc;"
| 57 || February 20 || @ Vancouver Canucks || 3–3 || 25–19–13 || 63 || 
|- style="background:#cfc;"
| 58 || February 23 || @ Colorado Rockies || 5–3 || 26–19–13 || 65 || 
|- style="background:#cfc;"
| 59 || February 24 || @ Los Angeles Kings || 4–3 || 27–19–13 || 67 || 
|-

|- style="background:#ffc;"
| 60 || March 1 || @ Boston Bruins || 4–4 || 27–19–14 || 68 || 
|- style="background:#fcf;"
| 61 || March 3 || @ Toronto Maple Leafs || 3–4 || 27–20–14 || 68 || 
|- style="background:#cfc;"
| 62 || March 4 || @ Buffalo Sabres || 6–1 || 28–20–14 || 70 || 
|- style="background:#cfc;"
| 63 || March 6 || Colorado Rockies || 5–0 || 29–20–14 || 72 || 
|- style="background:#fcf;"
| 64 || March 8 || Chicago Black Hawks || 1–5 || 29–21–14 || 72 || 
|- style="background:#fcf;"
| 65 || March 10 || @ Pittsburgh Penguins || 2–3 || 29–22–14 || 72 || 
|- style="background:#cfc;"
| 66 || March 11 || Los Angeles Kings || 6–3 || 30–22–14 || 74 || 
|- style="background:#cfc;"
| 67 || March 14 || @ Chicago Black Hawks || 4–0 || 31–22–14 || 76 || 
|- style="background:#cfc;"
| 68 || March 15 || Atlanta Flames || 5–4 || 32–22–14 || 78 || 
|- style="background:#cfc;"
| 69 || March 17 || Buffalo Sabres || 5–3 || 33–22–14 || 80 || 
|- style="background:#cfc;"
| 70 || March 18 || St. Louis Blues || 5–3 || 34–22–14 || 82 || 
|- style="background:#fcf;"
| 71 || March 21 || @ Minnesota North Stars || 3–7 || 34–23–14 || 82 || 
|- style="background:#cfc;"
| 72 || March 23 || @ Atlanta Flames || 4–1 || 35–23–14 || 84 || 
|- style="background:#cfc;"
| 73 || March 25 || Washington Capitals || 7–4 || 36–23–14 || 86 || 
|- style="background:#ffc;"
| 74 || March 27 || @ New York Rangers || 4–4 || 36–23–15 || 87 || 
|- style="background:#cfc;"
| 75 || March 29 || Vancouver Canucks || 5–0 || 37–23–15 || 89 || 
|- style="background:#cfc;"
| 76 || March 31 || @ St. Louis Blues || 4–2 || 38–23–15 || 91 || 
|-

|- style="background:#cfc;"
| 77 || April 1 || New York Rangers || 7–3 || 39–23–15 || 93 || 
|- style="background:#fcf;"
| 78 || April 5 || New York Islanders || 1–3 || 39–24–15 || 93 || 
|- style="background:#fcf;"
| 79 || April 7 || @ New York Islanders || 2–9 || 39–25–15 || 93 || 
|- style="background:#cfc;"
| 80 || April 8 || Atlanta Flames || 4–2 || 40–25–15 || 95 || 
|-

|-
| Legend:

Playoffs

|- style="background:#fcf;"
| 1 || April 10 || Vancouver Canucks || 2–3 || Canucks lead 1–0 || 
|- style="background:#cfc;"
| 2 || April 12 || @ Vancouver Canucks || 6–4 || Series tied 1–1 || 
|- style="background:#cfc;"
| 3 || April 14 || Vancouver Canucks || 7–2 || Flyers win 2–1 || 
|-

|- style="background:#cfc;"
| 1 || April 16 || New York Rangers || 3–2 OT || Flyers lead 1–0 || 
|- style="background:#fcf;"
| 2 || April 18 || New York Rangers || 1–7 || Series tied 1–1 || 
|- style="background:#fcf;"
| 3 || April 20 || @ New York Rangers || 1–5 || Rangers lead 2–1 || 
|- style="background:#fcf;"
| 4 || April 22 || @ New York Rangers || 0–6 || Rangers lead 3–1 || 
|- style="background:#fcf;"
| 5 || April 24 || New York Rangers || 3–8 || Rangers win 4–1 || 
|-

|-
| Legend:

Player statistics

Scoring
 Position abbreviations: C = Center; D = Defense; G = Goaltender; LW = Left Wing; RW = Right Wing
  = Joined team via a transaction (e.g., trade, waivers, signing) during the season. Stats reflect time with the Flyers only.
  = Left team via a transaction (e.g., trade, waivers, release) during the season. Stats reflect time with the Flyers only.

Goaltending
  = Joined team via a transaction (e.g., trade, waivers, signing) during the season. Stats reflect time with the Flyers only.

Awards and records

Awards

Records

Among the team records set during the 1978–79 season was Behn Wilson scoring 49 points, the most for a rookie defenseman in club history. Wilson, along with Blake Dunlop and Al Hill, combined to score three goals in 35 seconds during the second period of a March 1 game against the Boston Bruins, tied for the fastest three goals in team history. On March 11, Frank Bathe received a club record 55 penalty minutes during a March 11 game against the Los Angeles Kings. During the fifth and final game of their quarterfinal playoff series loss to the New York Rangers, the Flyers six goals against during the third period is a team record. The five shorthanded goals they allowed during the series is also a single playoff series high.

The 1978–79 season was the final season of Bernie Parent’s career, who hold several career records for the team. Parent holds the regular season marks for most ties (102), shutouts (50), and minutes played (28,215). He also holds the playoff marks for seasons played (7, tied with Ron Hextall), shutouts (6), and save percentage (.916).

Transactions
The Flyers were involved in the following transactions from May 26, 1978, the day after the deciding game of the 1978 Stanley Cup Finals, through May 21, 1979, the day of the deciding game of the 1979 Stanley Cup Finals.

Trades

Players acquired

Players lost

Draft picks

Philadelphia's picks at the 1978 NHL Amateur Draft, which was held at the Queen Elizabeth Hotel in Montreal, Quebec, on June 15, 1978.

Farm teams
The Flyers were affiliated with the Maine Mariners of the AHL, the Milwaukee Admirals of the IHL, and the Jersey Aces of the NEHL.

Notes

References
General
 
 
 
Specific

Philadelphia Flyers seasons
Philadelphia
Philadelphia
Pitts
Pitts